Mammillaria perezdelarosae is a cactus – a member of the family Cactaceae, placed in the tribe Cacteae. This cactus is common. It blooms with light pink and white flowers and is native to Jalisco, Mexico.

Cultivation
This cactus needs at least  to survive, is recommended for USDA zones 9-11 and needs little water, as do most cacti.

References

External links

perezdelarosae
Cacti of Mexico
Endemic flora of Mexico